"Dance & Shout" / "Hope" is the fourth and final official single from Shaggy's multi-platinum studio album Hot Shot, released on 19 November 2001. The single was made up of two tracks that had previously been released as singles in exclusive territories. "Dance & Shout" samples "Shake Your Body (Down to the Ground)" by The Jacksons.

Background
"Hope" was a song first recorded for the soundtrack of the film For Love of the Game, and was released as a single from the soundtrack exclusively in America on 23 November 1999, however, to no commercial success. "Dance & Shout" was released as a preceding single to Hot Shot exclusively in Europe on 11 July 2000, achieving only minor success; however, the song peaked at number 42 on the ARIA Singles Chart and number four on the Bubbling Under Billboard Hot 100 chart due to import sales. In November 2001, following the release of the three official worldwide singles from Hot Shot—"It Wasn't Me", "Angel" and "Luv Me, Luv Me", both "Dance & Shout" and "Hope" were re-released as a double A-side for all territories.

Track listing
 UK
 "Dance & Shout" (Shark Radio Edit) – 3:11
 "Hope" (Album Version) – 3:45
 "Dance & Shout" (Klub Kings Remix) – 6:30

 Europe
 "Dance & Shout" (Shark Radio Edit) – 3:11
 "Dance & Shout" (Klub Kings Radio Edit) – 3:34
 "Hope" (Album Version) – 3:45
 "Dance & Shout" (Klub Kings Remix Video)

 Australia
 "Dance & Shout" (Shark Radio Edit) – 3:11
 "Hope" (Album Version) – 3:45
 "Why You Mad At Me" – 3:16
 "Hope" (Enhanced Video)

 Non-double A-side releases prior to single

 Hope (America)
 Main single
 "Hope" (LP Version) – 4:06
 "Not Fair" – 3:34
 "Hope" (Remix) – 4:23

 For the Love of the Game soundtrack single
 "Hope" (Radio Edit) – 3:28
 "Hope" (LP Version) – 4:06

 Dance & Shout (Europe)
 CD single
 "Dance & Shout" (Shark Radio Edit) – 3:11
 "Dance & Shout" (Klub Kings Remix) – 6:30
 "Dance & Shout" (Pussy 2000 Club Mix) – 8:14
 "Dance & Shout" (MPC's Mix) – 5:55

 Limited edition enhanced single
 "Dance & Shout" (Shark Radio Edit) – 3:11
 "Dance & Shout" (Dancehall Version) – 3:46
 "Dance & Shout" (Klub Kings Remix) – 6:30
 "Dance & Shout" (Pussy 2000 Club Mix) – 8:14
 "Dance & Shout" (MPC's Mix) – 5:55
 "Dance & Shout" (Klub Kings Remix Video)

Charts

Notes

References

2001 singles
Shaggy (musician) songs
Dancehall songs
Reggae fusion songs
1999 songs
2000 songs
Songs written by Shaggy (musician)